Exoplectra miniata is a species of coccinelid found in Brazil. It is known to feed on extra-floral nectar of the plant Inga edulis.

References 

Coccinellidae
Beetles described in 1824
Insects of Brazil